James Dickey (1923–1997) was an American poet and novelist.

James Dickey may also refer to:

 James Edward Dickey (1864–1928), American Methodist Episcopal bishop
 James Dickey (basketball, born 1954), American basketball coach
 James Dickey (basketball, born 1996), American basketball player
 Jim Dickey (1934–2018), American football coach
 James Dickey (United Irishmen) (1775/76–1798), Ulster Presbyterian barrister and member of the Society of the United Irishmen
 James Dickey (Texas politician) (born 1966), American politician